Kot Samaba railway station (Urdu and ) is located in Kot Samaba village, Rahim Yar Khan district of Punjab province of the Pakistan.

See also
 List of railway stations in Pakistan
 Pakistan Railways

References

External links

Railway stations in Rahim Yar Khan District
Railway stations on Karachi–Peshawar Line (ML 1)